The  is a 16.5 km (10.3 mi) railway line in Toyama Prefecture, Japan, operated by West Japan Railway Company (JR West). It connects Takaoka Station in Takaoka with Himi Station in Himi.

Service outline
Although technically different lines, the Himi Line and the Jōhana Line are sometimes advertised as a single entity. Both start from Takaoka Station and share train sets with local livery.

Stations

History
The line opened on 29 December 1900 between Takaoka and Fushiki, operated by the Chuetsu Railway. It was extended to Himi on 19 September 1912. The company was nationalised on 1 September 1920. With the privatization of JNR on 1 April 1987, the Himi Line was transferred to the ownership and control of JR West.

References

External links

 Jōhana and Himi Line information 

 
Rail transport in Toyama Prefecture
Lines of West Japan Railway Company
1067 mm gauge railways in Japan
Railway lines opened in 1900
1900 establishments in Japan